The Consolation Rounds for the 1991 Federation Cup was held from 19–23 July at the Nottingham Tennis Centre in Nottingham, United Kingdom, on hard courts.

The sixteen teams that were defeated in the first round of qualifying participated in the four-round knockout competition.

Participating teams

Draw

First round

South Korea vs. Hong Kong

Bolivia vs. Norway

Thailand vs. India

Turkey vs. Kenya

Jamaica vs. Philippines

Malaysia vs. Sri Lanka

Bahamas vs. Dominican Republic

Trinidad and Tobago vs. Ireland

Quarterfinals

South Korea vs. Norway

Thailand vs. Turkey

Philippines vs. Sri Lanka

Dominican Republic vs. Ireland

Semifinals

Norway vs. Thailand

Philippines vs. Ireland

Final

Norway vs. Ireland

References

External links
 Fed Cup website

Consolation Rounds